The Greater of Two Evils is an album by American heavy metal band Anthrax. It was released in November 2004 via the Sanctuary record label. It is the last Anthrax release prior to the band's reunion with Joey Belladonna and guitarist Dan Spitz.

The album is made up of 14 songs from the band's early era that were first released between 1983 and 1990. These tracks have been re-recorded by Anthrax's 2004 lineup, with vocalist John Bush recording new versions of songs originally sung by Neil Turbin and Joey Belladonna. The final track listing was decided by a vote on the band's website. The track list was then recorded by the band "live" in the studio over two days. The album was originally going to be named "Metallum Maximum Aeturnum", with possible plans to change it to "Old School, New School, Our School: Metallum Maximum Aeturnum" or "Metal Thrashing Mad: Metallum Maximum Aeturnum". The album sleeve features liner notes by comedian and Anthrax fan Brian Posehn.

The album did not chart in the US, selling 3,421 copies in its first week.

Track listing

Bonus disc (Japanese edition)
The following tracks are available on a 2-disc Japanese version sold in other countries as an import.

Trivia
The Japanese katakana writing on the front cover says: スラッシュ　メタル, literally Surasshu Metaru (a transliteration of "thrash metal").
On the original version of the album, "Lone Justice" appears as a hidden track. It begins after "Gung-Ho" ends, and is followed by the sound of "Lone Justice" being rewound. The song was included due to what seemed to be a strong demand for the track to be recorded by the members of the band's official message board, although many on the board claimed that the high votes for the song were a result of internet sabotage of the voting process. This addition to the album was not included on the Japanese edition, which featured an additional disc, on which "Lone Justice" was featured as a separate track.
"Efilnikufesin (N.F.L.)" is listed as N.F.L. on the cover of the album.

Personnel
John Bush – lead vocals
Rob Caggiano – lead guitar, occasional Rhythm guitar
Scott Ian – rhythm guitar, backing vocals, occasional lead guitar (Panic, Anthrax)
Frank Bello – bass, backing vocals
Charlie Benante – drums

References

2004 compilation albums
Anthrax (American band) compilation albums
Sanctuary Records compilation albums
Nuclear Blast compilation albums